Gregory Allen Marx (July 18, 1950 – October 5, 2018) was an American football defensive end who played one season with the Atlanta Falcons of the National Football League (NFL). He was drafted by the Falcons in the second round of the 1973 NFL Draft. He played college football at the University of Notre Dame.

Early years
Marx played high school football at Detroit Catholic Central High School in Novi, Michigan, earning 1st Team All-City, All-State and All-American honors. He was named the
state's Defensive Player of the Year by the Detroit News. He also participated in basketball, helping the 1968 team to the Catholic League and City Championships. Marx also earned All-City and All-State recognition in 1968. He was inducted into the Detroit Catholic Central High School Athletic Hall of Fame in 2008.

College career
Marx played for the Notre Dame Fighting Irish from 1970 to 1972. He was a Consensus All-American and co-captain of the Fighting Irish football team in 1972. He recorded career totals of 263 tackles and six pass breakups. Marx played in the College All-Star game and Hula Bowl in 1973. He was also a two-time CoSIDA Academic All-American. He earned post-graduate scholarships from the NCAA and National Football Foundation.

Professional career
Marc was selected by the Atlanta Falcons with the 39th pick in the 1973 NFL Draft. He played in fourteen games for the Falcons during the 1973 season.

Personal life
Marx earned a Juris Doctor degree from Notre Dame Law School in 1977 and subsequently worked in the banking and securities industries. Marx died on October 5, 2018 at the age of 68.

References

External links
Just Sports Stats

2018 deaths
1950 births
Players of American football from Detroit
American football defensive ends
Notre Dame Fighting Irish football players
Atlanta Falcons players
All-American college football players
Notre Dame Law School alumni
20th-century American businesspeople
American financial businesspeople
Businesspeople from Michigan
Detroit Catholic Central High School alumni